The 2012–13 season is Scunthorpe United F.C.'s second consecutive in Third Tier of the Football League.

League One data

Standings

Results summary

Result round by round

Squad

Statistics

 

    

 
|-
|colspan="14"|Players currently on loan:

|-
|colspan="14"|Players featured for club who have left:

 

 

|}

Goalscoring record

Disciplinary record

Transfers

In

Loans in

Out

Loans out

Contracts

Fixtures & Results

Pre-season

League One

FA Cup

League Cup

League Trophy

Overall summary

Summary

Score overview

References

2012–13
2012–13 Football League One by team